Highgate Airport  is located  north of Highgate, Ontario, Canada.

References

Registered aerodromes in Ontario